Hardres may refer to:

People
Hardres baronets
John Hardres, MP for Canterbury
Thomas Hardres (1610–1681), English barrister and politician
Sir William Hardres, 4th Baronet (1686–1736), British politician
Sir Hardres Waller

Places
Lower Hardres, a village and civil parish near Canterbury, Kent, England
Upper Hardres, a village and civil parish near Canterbury, Kent, England